USS Wakulla (AOG-44) was a Mettawee-class gasoline tanker acquired by the U.S. Navy for the dangerous task of transporting gasoline to warships in the fleet, and to remote Navy stations.

The second ship to be named Wakulla, AOG-44 was laid down on 31 October 1944 under a Maritime Commission contract (MC hull 2070) at Bayonne, New Jersey, by the East Coast Shipyards, Inc.; launched on 17 December 1944; sponsored by Mrs. J. I. McClain; accepted by the Navy on 15 January 1945; converted to naval use at the builder's yard; and commissioned at the New York Navy Yard on 3 February 1945. Named in honor of  Wakulla County, FL.

World War II service 
 
Following trials in Long Island Sound and shakedown out of Norfolk, Virginia, Wakulla got underway on 23 March 1945 for the Netherlands West Indies. She loaded a full cargo of diesel oil and high-octane gasoline at Aruba and shaped course westward.

Pacific Ocean operations 

She passed through the Panama Canal from 5 April to 7 April, arrived at San Diego, California, on the 22d, and got underway for the Hawaiian Islands on the 30th. Assigned to Service Squadron (ServRon) 8 soon after her 11 May arrival at Pearl Harbor, Wakulla subsequently made one voyage to Canton Island in the Phoenix group and two to Johnston Island—each time with full cargoes of high-octane gasoline. During one of her cruises to Johnston, she interrupted unloading operations to put to sea and tow LST-765 into port after a damaged screw and an inoperable rudder had left the tank landing ship adrift.
 
Wakulla served as yard oiler at Pearl Harbor through VJ-day.

Post-war activity 

After ServRon 8 was disestablished in September, the gasoline tanker operated under the dual control of the Commandant, 14th Naval District, and Commander, Service Force, Pacific Fleet, into late 1945.

Decommissioning 

She sailed for the U.S. West Coast in January 1946 and was decommissioned at San Francisco, California, on 13 June 1946. Wakulla was struck from the Navy list on 19 July 1946 and transferred to the Maritime Commission on 14 November 1946 where she was sold the same day for commercial service to the Oriental Trade & Transport Co where she was renamed Mei An. In 1948, she was sold to the Standard Vacuum Co and renamed Stanvac Ogan where she served until 1963 when she was sold to Petroleum Sg Service and renamed Sea Raven. Sold again in 1968 to Mobil Oil Malaya, she was renamed Mobil Service and served as such until 1980 when she was scrapped.

References

External links 
 NavSource Online: Service Ship Photo Archive - AOG-44 Wakulla

 

Mettawee-class gasoline tankers
Type T1-M-A2 tankers of the United States Navy
Ships built in Bayonne, New Jersey
1944 ships
World War II auxiliary ships of the United States